Serbs in Germany refers to persons living in Germany who have total or partial Serbian ancestry. They form the seventh largest group of foreigners in Germany.

Demographics
The majority (64%) of the Serbian population is concentrated in three federal states: North Rhine-Westphalia, Baden-Württemberg and Bavaria. Within the three states the Serbs are numerous in Düsseldorf, Stuttgart and especially Munich. Ulm had the highest share of migrants from Serbia in 2011 according to German Census data.  But a considerable part of the Serbian Migrants was not included, because it still went under former nationalities (Federal Republic of Yugoslavia, Serbia and Montenegro, Serbia until 2008) at the time of the census.
According to the Federal Statistical Office, at the end of 2015 the number of foreigners with Serbian nationality in Germany stood at 230,427. Another 29,785 foreigners living in Germany with the citizenship of the former Serbia and Montenegro have not yet decided on one of the possible new citizenships.

Official data:
1925: 14,067 (Yugoslav nationality)
1935: 17,258 (Yugoslav nationality)
1939: 58,240 (Yugoslav nationality)
1968: 99,000 (workers)
1971: 469,000 (workers)
1973: 471,000 (workers)
1988: 295,000 (workers)
1989: 300,000 (workers)
1990: 652,500 (Yugoslav nationality)
1994: 420,000 (Serbia and Montenegro)
1995: 418,000 (Serbia and Montenegro)
2001: 304,000 (Serbia and Montenegro)
2003: 568,240 (Serbia and Montenegro); 112,507 Germany-born Serbian nationals
2011: 197,984 (Serbian nationals)
2013: 241,374 (Serbian nationals)
2015:  (Serbian ancestry)

Notable people

Danko Bošković, footballer
Marko Djurdjević, illustrator
Dejan Janjatović, footballer, Croatian Serb
Slobodan Komljenović, footballer
Srđan Maksimović, footballer
Marko Marin, footballer, Bosnian Serb 
Tamara Milosevic, documentary filmmaker
Zvjezdan Misimović, footballer, Bosnian Serb parentage
Nikola Mladenović, footballer
Wolfgang Nešković, politician
Dragan Paljić, footballer, Bosnian Serb parentage
Andrea Petkovic, female tennis player, Bosnian-born, Serb father
Marjan Petković, footballer
Aleksandro Petrović, footballer, Bosnian-Serb
Iván Petrovich, actor, silent screen star, Serbian-born
Petar Radenković, footballer
Vladimir Ranković, footballer
Michael Rensing, footballer, Serbian mother
Sreto Ristić, retired footballer
Christina Sampanidis, female footballer, Serbian mother
Marko Savić, water poloist
Kristian Sprećaković, footballer
Aleksandar Stevanović, footballer
Predrag Stevanović, footballer
Neven Subotić, footballer, Bosnian Serb
Stefan Kapičić, actor, German born
Branko Tomović, actor, Serbian parents
David Vržogić, footballer
Marc Vucinovic, footballer
Konstantin Grcic, world renown industrial designer

See also

Serbian diaspora
Germany–Serbia relations
Demographics of Germany

References

External links
Information on the Serbian community in Germany (In German)
 Web site of a Serbian association in Germany (In German and Serbian)

Germany
European diaspora in Germany
 
Germany
Germany
Germany
Germany–Serbia relations
Serbian Orthodox Church in Germany